I Wonder Who's Killing Her Now? (original USA theatrical name Kill My Wife, Please) is a 1975 black comedy movie directed by Steven Hilliard Stern, and starring Bob Dishy and Joanna Barnes. Originally Peter Sellers was to be cast as the lead, but insurance refused to cover him after a recent heart attack, and Dishy was cast as his replacement at the last moment. It was directed by Steven Hilliard Stern, from a screenplay by Mickey Rose.

The title is a play on the old musical I Wonder Who's Kissing Her Now.

Soundtrack is Polonaise Op.53 in A flat major (Frédéric Chopin).

Plot

Jordan Oliver (Dishy) is caught embezzling $250,000 from his employer but, as he is the boss' son-in-law, is given a chance to pay it back. Meanwhile, his wealthy wife Clarice (Barnes) is about to divorce him. He can only get the money by having his wife murdered for $1 million life insurance. He hires a hitman Bobo (Bill Dana) to kill his wife; Bobo subcontracts the job out to another hitman, who in turn subcontracts it out and so on until an actor is the hitman for just $6.95. When Oliver is told his wife's insurance is invalid, he must rescue his wife before she's murdered.

Cast
 Bob Dishy
 Joanna Barnes
 Bill Dana
 Severn Darden
 Harvey Jason
 Marjorie Bennett
 Jay Robinson
 Vito Scotti
 George Memmoli
 Jack DeLeon
 Steve Franken
 Richard Libertini

Home media
The movie was released in the US and UK.

See also
 List of American films of 1975

References

Further reading

 Wild Realm Reviews: I Wonder Who's Killing Her Now
 AllMovie | Movies and Films Database | Movie Search, Ratings, Photos, Recommendations, and Reviews

External links 
 
 

1975 films
1970s crime comedy films
American black comedy films
American crime comedy films
Films scored by Patrick Williams
Films directed by Steven Hilliard Stern
1975 comedy films
1970s English-language films
1970s American films